This is a list of EMS Cooperative members.
Since its creation, more than 181 postal administrations have joined the EMS Cooperative, representing over 97% of global EMS traffic.

References

Express mail